Pietro Sandro Nenni (9 February 1891 – 1 January 1980) was an Italian socialist politician, the national secretary of the Italian Socialist Party (PSI) and senator for life since 1970. He was a recipient of the Lenin Peace Prize in 1951. He was one of the founders of the Italian Republic and a central figure of the Italian political left from the 1920s to the 1960s.

Early life and career
He was born in Faenza, in Emilia-Romagna. After his peasant parents died, he was placed in an orphanage by an aristocratic family. Every Sunday, he recited his catechism before the countess and if he did well, he received a silver coin. "Generous but humiliating", he recalled.

He affiliated with the Italian Republican Party. In 1908, he became editor of a republican paper in Forlì. The socialist paper in the town was edited at the time by Benito Mussolini, later the Fascist dictator of Italy. In 1909 he entered political life by joining the Italian Republican party. Nenni was arrested in 1911 for his participation in a socialist protest against Italy's imperialistic war in Libya alongside Mussolini and was imprisoned for seven months.

First World War
When the First World War broke out, he advocated the intervention of Italy in the war. In 1915, he volunteered for the Isonzo front. After he was wounded and sent home, he became an editor of the republican paper Mattine d'Italia. He defended Italy's participation in the war but tried not to alienate his socialist friends. In the last years of the war Nenni served at the front again.

When the war was over, he founded, together with some disillusioned revolutionary ex-servicemen, a group called "Fascio", which was soon dissolved and replaced by a real Fascist body. While the socialist Mussolini became a fascist, the republican Nenni joined the Socialist Party in 1921 after its split with the wing that would form the Italian Communist Party (PCI).

In 1923, after the Fascist March on Rome, he became the editor of PSI's official organ, Avanti!, and engaged in antifascist activism. In 1925 he was arrested for publishing a booklet on the fascist murder of Socialist leader Giacomo Matteotti. When the Avanti offices were set aflame and the paper prohibited in 1926, he took refuge in France, where he became secretary of the PSI.

In exile
Nenni had worked in Paris as a correspondent of the Avanti in 1921 and had become acquainted with Léon Blum, Marcel Cachin, Romain Rolland and Georges Sorel. During his Parisian exile, Nenni made a decisive contribution to the survival of the Italian Socialist Party, which had moved abroad, and he worked for an alliance between the various anti-fascist parties which had been driven into exile. In 1935, he helped lead the Italian opposition to Mussolini's invasion of Ethiopia. Nenni went on to fight with the International Brigades in the Spanish Civil War. He was the co-founder and the political commissar of the Garibaldi Brigade. After the defeat of the Spanish Republic and the victory of General Francisco Franco he returned to France. In 1943, he was arrested by the Germans in Vichy France and then imprisoned in Italy on the island of Ponza.

Nenni's third daughter, Vittoria, was active in the French resistance.  She was captured and deported to Auschwitz, where she was murdered on 25 July 1943, aged 28.

After being liberated in August 1943, he returned to Rome to lead the Italian Socialist Party, which had been reunified as the Italian Socialist Party of Proletarian Unity. After the surrender of Italy with the Allied armed forces on 8 September 1943, he was one of the political officials of the National Liberation Committee, the underground political entity of Italian Partisans during the German occupation.

Postwar politics
In 1944, he became the national secretary of the PSI again, favoring close ties between his party and the PCI. After the Liberation, he took up government responsibilities, becoming Deputy Prime Minister and Minister for the Constituent Assembly in the government of Ferruccio Parri and the first government of Alcide De Gasperi. He was Minister for the Constitution, and in October 1946 he became  Minister for Foreign Affairs in the second De Gasperi government.

The close ties between the PSI and the PCI caused the Giuseppe Saragat-led anti-communist wing of the PSI to leave and form the Italian Socialist Workers' Party in 1947 (later merged into the Italian Democratic Socialist Party, PSDI). During the early stage of the cold war he opposed Italy's entry into NATO fearing that it could drag the country into a war between the two Superpowers and reignite the Italian civil war and instead favoured a policy of Neutrality. In 1951 he was awarded the Stalin peace prize.

In 1956, Nenni broke with the PCI after Soviet Union's invasion of Hungary. He returned the award and donated the Prize money ($25,000) to the International red Cross. Subsequently, he slowly led his party into supporting membership of the North Atlantic Treaty Organization (NATO) and he sought co-operation with the leading party, the Christian Democrats.

Opening to centre-left
In the early 1960s he facilitated an "opening to the center-left" enabling coalition governments between the PSI and the Christian Democrats and leading the socialists back into office for the first time since 1947. He formed a centre-left coalition with Saragat, Aldo Moro and Ugo La Malfa, and favored a reunion with the PSDI. From 1963 to 1968 he was Deputy Prime Minister in the three successive governments led by Moro and in December 1968 he became Minister for Foreign Affairs in the first government of Mariano Rumor, but resigned in July 1969, when the center-left alliance collapsed.

Although the reunification attempts between the socialists and Giuseppe Saragat's breakaway Social Democrats resulted in the formation of a joint list Unified PSI–PSDI, both parties fared poorly in the 1968 Italian general election. In 1969, a disillusioned Nenni virtually retired and Francesco De Martino took his place. He resigned as head of the PSI and was made a senator for life in 1970 and in 1971 he ran unsuccessfully for President of Italy. He died in Rome on 1 January 1980. A daughter, Vittoria "Viva" Daubeuf, was murdered in Auschwitz. She is commemorated in the writings of Charlotte Delbo.

He was an atheist.

Electoral history

References

External links

 Where the Italian Socialists Stand, Pietro Nenni, Foreign Affairs, January 1962
 Address given by Pietro Nenni on the military intervention in Czechoslovakia, Rome, August 29, 1968
 

|-

|-

|-

|-

|-

|-

20th-century Italian journalists
1891 births
1980 deaths
People from Faenza
Italian atheists
Italian Republican Party politicians
Italian Socialist Party politicians
Deputy Prime Ministers of Italy
Foreign ministers of Italy
Members of the National Council (Italy)
Members of the Constituent Assembly of Italy
Deputies of Legislature I of Italy
Deputies of Legislature II of Italy
Deputies of Legislature III of Italy
Deputies of Legislature IV of Italy
Deputies of Legislature V of Italy
Italian life senators
Candidates for President of Italy
Politicians of Emilia-Romagna
Italian male journalists
Italian military personnel of World War I
Italian prisoners and detainees
Prisoners and detainees of Germany
Italian expatriates in France
Italian people of the Spanish Civil War
International Brigades personnel
Italian resistance movement members
Members of the Executive of the Labour and Socialist International
Stalin Peace Prize recipients
Italian anti-fascists
Exiled Italian politicians
Italian magazine founders